Louisiana Highway 1065 (LA 1065) is a mostly rural highway in Tangipahoa Parish, Louisiana between Hammond and Independence. In its more trafficked southern end it is known as North Cherry Street and outside Hammond, North Cherry Street Extension. LA 1065 is a two-lane highway for the entirety of its .

Route description
From the south, LA 1065 begins at US 190 in Hammond's Historic District.  Proceeding due north, it bridges Ponchatoula Creek and forms a T-intersection with LA 3234 (University Avenue) on the west.  It leaves Hammond and enters Tickfaw, crossing crosses LA 1064 (Natalbany Road) and LA 442.  North of LA 442, LA 1065 enters Independence and has six sharp turns, the last cosigning it with Cypress Street near central Independence. At the intersection of Cypress Street and Tiger Avenue (so named because the tiger is the mascot of adjacent Independence High School), LA 1065 turns west to follow Tiger Avenue in crossing the Canadian National Railway and immediately to end at the perpendicular US 51 (West Railroad Avenue); directly across that intersection, LA 1063 (cosigned with Fifth Street) assumes the trajectory of LA 1065 and Tiger Avenue.  

LA 1065 supports egress for Southeastern Louisiana University via LA 3234. Additionally, it serves significantly as a farm-to-market road and, together with LA 442, facilitates recreational access to the Tangipahoa River.

History
LA 1065 is an old road, its original role in connecting Hammond and Independence having been assumed in the 1930s by US 51, which was in turn sidelined in the 1960s by I-55.

LA 1065 has an anomaly at its southern terminus. US 190 at that point was originally a two-way route entirely on Thomas Street in Hammond.  In the 1960s US 190 in Hammond was reconstructed as a divided highway, with westbound traffic on Thomas Street and eastbound traffic one block south on Morris Street. But in the change, accidentally, no provision was made for the one block of Cherry Street between Morris Street and Thomas Street  to become state highway. As an afterthought, traffic eastbound on US 190 has a sign reading "TO" LA 1065 with a left arrow. Officially, traffic is not on LA 1065 until it is north of Thomas Street.

Major intersections

References

External links

LADOTD Official Control Section Map - District 62
Southern Tangipahoa Parish Highway Map
Northern Tangipahoa Parish Highway Map
Louisiana State Highway Log

Southeastern Louisiana University
1065
Transportation in Tangipahoa Parish, Louisiana
Hammond, Louisiana